Piero Colli (born 1 January 1914 in Vigevano – died 19 March 2010) was an Italian professional football player. He made 115 appearances for Vigevano.

Honours
 Serie A champion: 1937/38.

1914 births
2010 deaths
Italian footballers
Serie A players
Inter Milan players
S.S.D. Lucchese 1905 players
S.S.C. Bari players
Association football midfielders
A.C. Meda 1913 players
Vigevano Calcio players